Bairnsdale Power Station is a  natural gas-fired power station in Victoria’s East Gippsland region, owned and operated by Alinta Energy. It is a fast start, peaking power station dispatching into the National Electricity Market. Bairnsdale Power Station is connected to the AusNet Services distribution network grid.

The station was commissioned in 2001. It has two GE LM6000PD gas turbines.

See also 

 Alinta Energy

References

External links 
Alinta Energy generation

Bairnsdale
Natural gas-fired power stations in Victoria (Australia)